Anolis cuscoensis is a species of lizard in the family Dactyloidae. The species is found in Peru.

References

Anoles
Reptiles described in 2008
Taxa named by Steven Poe
Endemic fauna of Peru
Reptiles of Peru